Scott Campbell (born June 6, 1986) is a Canadian professional ice hockey winger. He is currently playing with SønderjyskE Ishockey of the Danish Metal Ligaen.

Playing career

Campbell played 3 seasons of junior hockey for the Pembroke Lumber Kings of the Central Canada Hockey League playing 130 games scoring 74 goals and 96 assists for 170 points and a 1.31 points per game average.

Starting in the 2007–08 season Campbell began attending the University of Massachusetts Lowell and playing for the River Hawks.  In 4 seasons of college hockey at UMass Lowell he played 126 games, scored 39 goals and 46 assists for 85 points and was named to the 2009–10 and 2010–11 Hockey East All-Academic Teams.

Following his final season with UMass Lowell Campbell signed a professional tryout contract with the Houston Aeros and played 6 games without scoring a point.

The 2011–12 season saw Campbell sign with the Las Vegas Wranglers of the ECHL where he played 51 regular season games, scoring 31 points.  In the playoffs, he played 18 games scoring 10 points helping the Wranglers to the Western Conference championship, coming up 3 games short of a Kelly Cup Championship.  On December 21, 2011 the Rochester Americans signed Campbell to a professional tryout contract, he played 1 game for the Americans before being released to return to the Wranglers.  Campbell also signed a tryout contract with the Texas Stars of the AHL on February 18, 2012 where he played 12 games scoring no points, before being returned again to the Wranglers.

Campbell signed an extension with the Wranglers on August 14, 2012 to play in Las Vegas for the 2012–13 ECHL season, however he was signed to a tryout contract by the Bridgeport Sound Tigers on December 18, 2012.  Campbell was successful in his tryout and signed a standard player contract with the team on February 13, 2013.

The Boston Bruins invited Campbell to their 2013–14 training camp but he was among the first round of cuts on September 18, 2013 and was reassigned to the Providence Bruins of the AHL.  Campbell attended the Providence training camp however he was assigned to their ECHL affiliate the South Carolina Stingrays.  After 21 games with the Stingrays he was recalled to the Providence Bruins on December 10, 2013.

On September 13, 2014, Campbell as a free agent signed his first contract abroad, agreeing to a one-year contract with Italian club, HC Valpellice of the Serie A.

After one season in Italy Campbell signed a one-year contract with SønderjyskE Ishockey of the Metal Ligaen.

Career statistics

Awards and honors

References

External links

1986 births
Living people
Bridgeport Sound Tigers players
Canadian ice hockey left wingers
Houston Aeros (1994–2013) players
Las Vegas Wranglers players
Providence Bruins players
Rochester Americans players
South Carolina Stingrays players
Texas Stars players
UMass Lowell River Hawks men's ice hockey players
Ice hockey people from Ottawa